Jane Mary Griffiths (16 October 1929 – 11 June 1975) was an English actress who appeared in theatre, film and television between 1950 and 1966.

She played the female lead opposite Gregory Peck in The Million Pound Note (1954), but never appeared in another major film, and spent the rest of her career in B movies. Film historians Steve Chibnall and Brian McFarlane praised her "unexpectedly poignant" performance in The Durant Affair, in which she evokes "a convincing air of struggling to contain past sadness".

Filmography
 Double Confession (1950)
 The Gambler and the Lady (1952)
 The Million Pound Note (1954)
 The Green Scarf (1954)
 Shadow of a Man (1956)
 The Traitor (1957)
 Three Sundays to Live (1957)
 Tread Softly Stranger (1958)
 The Impersonator (1961) 
 The Third Alibi (1961)
 The Durant Affair (1962)
 Dead Man's Evidence (1962)
 The Double (1963)

References

External links 
 

1929 births
1975 deaths
Actresses from Sussex
English television actresses
English film actresses
20th-century English actresses
People from Peacehaven